PC Tools (founded in 2003), formerly known as WinGuides.com, was a software company acquired by Symantec in 2008; the new owner eventually discontinued the PC Tools name. Company headquarters were in Australia, with offices in Luxembourg, the United States, United Kingdom, Ireland and Ukraine. The company had previously developed and distributed security and optimization software for the Mac OS X and Microsoft Windows platforms.

Products
By 29 November 2006 software owned by PC Tools had been downloaded over 125 million times.

PC Tools Browser Defender
PC Tools Browser Defender, also called Browser Defender for short, is a browser toolbar for Internet Explorer and Mozilla Firefox browsers on Windows based computers. Browser Defender allows for safe web surfing.

PC Tools iAntiVirus
iAntivirus was updated in 2012 and rebranded under Symantec's Norton brand.

PC Tools iAntiVirus is free antivirus software for Intel based Apple Macintosh computers running Mac OS 10.5 (Leopard) and Mac OS 10.6 (Snow Leopard) initially released in June 2008, used to detect and remove malware, spyware and malicious exploits, using both signature-based and heuristic detection.

AntiVirus was criticized because it only scans for Macintosh viruses, ignoring Windows and Linux viruses. It was praised for its speed and low usage of system resources.

PC Tools Internet Security
PC Tools Internet Security, was the combination of the Spyware Doctor product the Firewall product and the Anti Spam product. It provided the functionality of all three stand alone products into a single seamless product. Symantec is no longer offering this product as of 18 May 2013. It was payware designed for Windows 8 (32-/64-bit), Windows 7 (32-/64-bit), Windows Vista (32-/64-bit) and Windows XP (32-bit).

PC Tools Registry Mechanic
PC Tools Registry Mechanic,  the first software PC Tools released, scanned the Windows registry to find errors. Version 11, released on 31 October 2011, is the last one.

PC Tools Spyware Doctor

PC Tools Spyware Doctor, is anti-malware software. Spyware Doctor detects malware based on indicators of compromise using its spider technology. The most recent version of Spyware Doctor is 9, which was released on 31 October 2011. Symantec is no longer offering this product as of 18 May 2013.

PC Tools Spyware Doctor with AntiVirus

PC Tools Spyware Doctor with AntiVirus has the same features as Spyware Doctor, with added anti-virus capabilities. Symantec has not sold this since 2013; v9 is the last one available.

ThreatExpert
The ThreatExpert Web site says that it is an advanced automated threat analysis system (initialized ATAS) built to analyze and report the actions of malware in a fully automated mode.  the latest version was beta version 1.0.1.0 of 1 March 2008. There have been no updates since March 2008, and the Web site seems inactive.

Acquisition by Symantec

On 18 August 2008, Symantec announced the signing of an agreement to acquire PC Tools such that PC Tools would maintain separate operations. The financial terms of the acquisition were not disclosed. Symantec acquired PC Tools for US$262,000,000 on 6 October 2008.

Symantec withdrew the entire PC Tools security portfolio, comprising PC Tools Internet Security, Spyware Doctor and Spyware Doctor with Antivirus, on 18 May 2013; PC Tools was not sold and could not be renewed from 4 December 2013. Symantec said that this would not affect PC Tools Utilities products.

Reception

Spyware Doctor received the PC World Best Buy award in the October 2007 issue of the magazine saying "PC Tools' Spyware Doctor 5.0 was the  winner, outperforming the competition at detecting and removing our test set of adware and spyware samples."

Spyware Doctor has received several Editors' Choice awards from PC Magazine, including one for Spyware Doctor with AntiVirus 5.5 in 2008. The product has also received numerous other awards from around the globe.

Not all reviews have been positive and early versions of Spyware Doctor 5.0, which the company rewrote from scratch, received some negative commentary.
CNET's Download.com  reviews, justifies the 3-star rating by saying, "in our trial scans, Spyware Doctor repeatedly flagged several dozen harmless cookies as potential threats, more than any other antispyware product we tested. We were also unable to learn more about each threat or why Spyware Doctor flagged each."

Criticism
Symantec was unsuccessfully sued by a Washington resident for running fake scans to get people to pay for subscriptions to PC Tools's Registry Mechanic, Performance Toolkit, and Norton Utilities The lawsuit claims the company intentionally ran the fake scans and the results were not real.

References

External links

ThreatExpert
iAntiVirus
Browser Defender

Antivirus software
Firewall software
Gen Digital acquisitions